Antonio Brunelli (20 December 1577 in Pisa – 19 November 1630 in Pisa) was an Italian composer and theorist of the early Baroque period.

He was a student of Giovanni Maria Nanino and served as the organist at San Miniato in Tuscany from 1604 to 1607, then moved to Prato where he served as maestro di capella at the Cathedral there. On 12 April 1612 he was appointed as maestro di capella to the Grand Duke of Tuscany. Between 1605 and 1621 he published works including motets, canzonette, Psalms, madrigals, Requiems, and other sacred works, some of which were included in Donfried's Promptuarium musicum (1623). Brunelli wrote and published several theoretical treatises, most notably the Regole utilissime per i scolari che desiderano imperare a cantare (Florence, 1606), one of the first published methods for voice. His other writings include Esercizi ad 1 e 2 voci (Florence, 1607) and Regole et dichiarazione de alcuni contrappunti doppii (Florence, 1610).

Works 
 Esercizi a una e due voci [op. 1] - Firenze, Marescotti (1605)
 Regole utilissime - Firenze, Volcmar Timan (1606)
 Affettuoso et invaghito, Canzonette a tre voci [op. 2] - Firenze, Marescotti (1608)
 Mottetti a due voci  Lib. 2 [op. 3] - Firenze, Marescotti (1608)
 Mottetti a due voci  Lib. 2 [op. 4] - Firenze, Marescotti (1608)
 Fiori odoranti, Madrigali a tre voci  Lib. 1 [op. 5] - Venezia (1609)
 Fiammette d'ingenio, Madrigali a tre voci Lib. 2 [op. 6] - Venezia (1610)
 Regole et dichiarazioni - Firenze, Marescotti (1610)
 Prati di sacri fiori musicali [op. 7] - Venezia, Vincenti (1612)
 Canoni vari  [op. 8] - Venezia, Vincenti (1612)
 Scherzi, arie, ... Lib.1 [op. 9] - Venezia, Vincenti (1613)
 Balletto della cortesia (1614)
 Scherzi, arie,... Lib.2 [op. 10] - Venezia, Vincenti (1614)
 Varii esercitii [op. 11] - Firenze, Zanobi Pignoni (1614)
 Scherzi, arie, ... Lib.3 [op. 12] - Venezia, Vincenti (1616)
 In raccolte d'epoca, ristampa di Tibi Laus Tibi Gloria, Mottetto a tre voci con b.c. (1616)
 Godi felice alfea, Aria a 2 voci - Venezia, Vincenti (1616)
 Sacra Cantica [op. 13] - Venezia, Vincenti (1617)
 Missae Tres Pro Defunctis [op. 14] - Venezia, Vincenti (1619)
 12 Salmi brevi concertati (senza cognome) - Pisa (1629)
 Musica per la festa del 31.1.1620 - (1620)
 Fioretti spirituali [op. 15 ] - Venezia, Magni (1621)
 From Ioannes Reinenger "Delicie Sacrae Musicae",  Ecce Panis Angelorum e Crux Fidelis a quattro voci - Ingolstadt, Haenlin (1626)

RecordingsFioretti Spirituali, Auser Musici, Carlo Ipata, director, Agorà AG 187.1 (1999)Arie, scherzi, canzonette & madrigali per suonare & cantare, Auser Musici, Carlo Ipata, director, Symphonia SY 04209 (2005)

References

Emiliano Ramacci: Relazione dal XVII Convegno della Società Italiana di Musicologia (Pisa 2010).

Emiliano Ramacci: La famiglia di Antonio Brunelli a Bagnoregio in Musiche D'Ingegno'', Pisa, Pacini, 1999.

External links 
 
 A. Brunelli su 'Tesori Musicali Toscani'

1577 births
1630 deaths
People from Santa Croce sull'Arno
Pupils of Giovanni Maria Nanino
Renaissance composers
Italian Baroque composers
17th-century Italian composers
Italian male classical composers
17th-century male musicians